FC Krystal Parkhomivka is a Ukrainian amateur football team from Parkhomivka, Bohodukhiv Raion, Kharkiv Oblast. In 1999 the team was a finalist of the National amateur football championship and the 1996–97 Ukrainian Amateur Cup and 2000 Ukrainian Amateur Cup.

Honors
 National Amateur Football Championship:
 Runners-up (1): 1998-99

 Ukrainian Amateur Cup
 Runners-up (2): 1996–97, 2000

 Football Championship of Kharkiv Oblast
 Winners (3): 1998, 1999, 2000

 Football Cup of Kharkiv Oblast
 Winners (5): 1995, 1996, 1998, 1999, 2000

League and cup history

{|class="wikitable"
|-bgcolor="#efefef"
! Season
! Div.
! Pos.
! Pl.
! W
! D
! L
! GS
! GA
! P
!Amateur Cup
!colspan=2|Europe
!Notes
|}

References

Krystal Parkhomivka, FC
Krystal Parkhomivka
Bohodukhiv Raion